"Can't Leave 'em Alone" is a R&B song recorded by American singer Ciara and rapper 50 Cent for Ciara's second album, Ciara: The Evolution (2006).  Written by Ciara, LaShawn Daniels, Rodney Jerkins, and 50 Cent, it is the fourth release and official third single from the album (see 2007 in music). It was solicited to Mainstream Urban radio stations on June 12, 2007 and Rhythmic stations on July 10, 2007.

The song is a 1980s-inspired mid-tempo ballad, featuring the 808 drums. Ciara described it as a "big record", and said that she invited 50 Cent for "some kind of flavor". It was originally titled "Dope Boys".

Background
"Can't Leave 'em Alone", along with "That's Right", was originally a contender to be the second US and first worldwide single from the album, and a poll was posted on Ciara's MySpace page to have fans help her decide, but the other contender "Like a Boy" was chosen over both songs. Later, "My Love" was confirmed to be the third US single, while "That's Right" would serve as the third internationally, but "Can't Leave 'em Alone" replaced both songs.

Composition
"Can't Leave 'em Alone" is an ode to the hood boys anchored by a pair of verses from 50 Cent, featuring an "easy groove".

Critical reception
"Can't Leave 'em Alone" received mixed reviews from music critics. Ken Barnes of USA TODAY called the song "pop-soul confection". Other reviewers were more critical of the song. Cibula of PopMatters published that it is "a very bad pop-lite song" and criticized the use of 50 Cent as a sexy bad boy. Christian Hoard of Rolling Stone published "Ciara's still prone to diva blandness and silly little pop songs, which drags down the 50 Cent feature 'Can't Leave 'em Alone' ". Makkadah Selah of The Village Voice called the song "lifeless".

Chart performance
"Can't Leave 'em Alone" was a moderate success in the US.  Six weeks after its official release, The single debuted at 90 on the US Billboard Hot 100. The song climbed the charts slowly with moderate airplay and digital sales. It eventually reached its peak at number 40. It also peaked at number 24 on the Hot 100 Airplay. It became Ciara's tenth top ten single on the US Hot R&B/Hip-Hop Songs chart and peaked in the top twenty of the Rhythmic Top 40. The single was never sent to mainstream radio formats and failed to chart on the Pop 100. Despite its lackluster performance at radio, the single was certified gold by the Recording Industry Association of America (RIAA) for sales of over 500,000 digital copies in the United States.

In international markets, "Can't Leave 'em Alone" debuted at number 40 and peaked at number four, becoming Ciara's fifth top ten single in New Zealand.  The song failed to chart in the United Kingdom, reaching a disappointing number 115.  The single peaked at low positions in China, Germany, and Poland.

Music video
The Fat Cats directed video was shot on June 9, 2007 and June 10, 2007 in Atlanta, Georgia. Three screen shots from the music video were released on June 14, 2007, while a fourth screen shot featuring her and 50 Cent was released on June 27, 2007. The video was scheduled to premiere on Yahoo! Music on June 25, but it was changed to July 2, 2007.

The video reached number one on 106 & Park.

Live performances 
Ciara performed "Can't Leave 'em Alone"  with 50 Cent at the 2007 World Music Awards on November 24, 2007.

Formats and track listings
These are the formats and track listings of major single releases of "Can't Leave 'Em Alone".

Maxi single Digital download
 "Can't Leave 'em Alone" featuring 50 Cent
 "Love You Better"

Extended play
 "Can't Leave 'em Alone" featuring 50 Cent
 "Can't Leave 'em Alone (Kookie Remix)" featuring 50 Cent
 "Can't Leave 'em Alone (Wideboys Remix)" featuring 50 Cent
 "Can't Leave 'em Alone (Reavers Remix)" featuring 50 Cent

Personnel
Recorded by Jeff Villanueva at 2nd Floor Studios, Atlantic City, New Jersey & Joshua Charvokas at Chung King Studios, New York City
Engineered by Gilbert Fuentes
Mixed by Phil Tan at Soapbox Studios, Atlanta, Georgia
Assisted by Josh Houghkirk
All music by Rodney "Darkchild" Jerkins
Vocals produced by Ciara Harris, LaShawn Daniels and Rodney Jerkins

Charts

Weekly charts

Year-end charts

Certifications

Release history

References

2000s ballads
2006 songs
2007 singles
50 Cent songs
Ciara songs
Pop ballads
Song recordings produced by Rodney Jerkins
Songs written by Ciara
Songs written by 50 Cent
Songs written by Rodney Jerkins
Songs written by LaShawn Daniels